Zeus (born 2019/2020) is a Great Dane from Bedford, Texas, United States. He currently holds the Guinness Book of World Records title of the tallest dog living in the world, standing at 1.046 meters (3 feet, 5.18 inches).

Zeus is owned by Brittany Davis. He was the largest pup in his litter of five, and was exceptionally large even as a younger dog. His diet consists of 12 cups of Gentle Giants Dog Food daily.

The tallest dog ever recorded, also a Great Dane, shared Zeus's name. He died of natural causes at the age of five in 2014.

References 

World record holders
Individual dogs in the United States